WWE Day of Reckoning 2 is a professional wrestling video game released for the GameCube by THQ. It is the sequel to WWE Day of Reckoning. The soundtrack features music by industrial metal group A Dark Halo, who performed two songs in the game including its theme song "Burn It All".

Day of Reckoning 2 has improved graphics over its predecessor, a new strategy-based submission system, and a storyline that allows the player to choose paths. This game was the last wrestling and/or WWE video game to be released for the GameCube and the first WWE game to feature Stone Cold Steve Austin as a legend along with the PlayStation 2 game, WWE SmackDown! vs. Raw 2006.

Gameplay 
Day of Reckoning 2 features similar gameplay to the previous Day of Reckoning game with returning features such as Momentum shift and momentum lift.  New to the game is the stamina meter, which slows wrestlers' movement over time and when completely depleted, temporarily leaves characters winded and open to attack. In addition, different levels of bleeding on the player's character also affect the character's ability to regain stamina.

The game also introduces four types of submission options. While applying a submission hold, players can choose from one of four submission types: a Taunt submission depletes the opponent's momentum meter, a Rest Hold submission allows the player's character to regain stamina, the Drain submission drains the opponent of stamina, while a regular submission move causes damage to a particular body part.

Players can again create wrestlers and customize each character's set of attacks. Each character can be assigned between one and nine finishing moves, one for each position an opponent is in. The game's Story Mode picks up from the story introduced in the first Day of Reckoning, but created wrestlers cannot be imported from the first game.

Story
The story continues from where the original Day of Reckoning left off, with the player's character at the top of the Raw roster. Almost a year after WrestleMania XX, Evolution has disbanded and the player's character has lost the World Heavyweight Championship back to Triple H and has fallen down the ranks of WWE. However, the player's character has gained a love interest in WWE Diva Stacy Keibler.

One month before WrestleMania 21, Triple H loses the title in a controversial match with Chris Jericho and the title is now up for grabs. In an attempt to increase the show's ratings, Raw General Manager Eric Bischoff decides to host a mini-tournament for the World Heavyweight Championship and the finals will be held at WrestleMania 21. The player's character eventually defeats Chris Jericho and advances into the finals. Triple H and the player's character prepare for the finals match before Bischoff reports that the belt was stolen.

The player advances in the story by gathering information on the whereabouts of the World Heavyweight Championship. Soon the player gets framed for stealing the belt, dumped by Stacy, fired and banned from Raw. However, SmackDown! General Manager Theodore Long signs the player to a lifetime SmackDown! contract. Eventually the player wins the WWE Championship and later finds out that former allies Chris Jericho and Randy Orton along with Edge had stolen the World Heavyweight Championship.

With the mystery solved, Triple H asks the player's wrestler for a title match at WrestleMania 21 in a Last Man Standing Match for the WWE Championship. The player's character wins the match, reunites with Stacy and reforges a friendship with Triple H, who turns face and takes possession of the newly found World Heavyweight Championship.

Reception

The game received "generally favorable" reviews according to video game review aggregator Metacritic.

See also

List of licensed wrestling video games
List of video games in the WWE Games series
List of fighting games

References

External links

2005 video games
GameCube games
GameCube-only games
THQ games
Video games developed in Japan
WWE video games
Yuke's games
Video game sequels
Multiplayer and single-player video games
Professional wrestling games